Airy may refer to:

 Sir George Biddell Airy (1801–1892), British Astronomer Royal from 1835 to 1881, for whom the following features, phenomena, and theories are named:
 Airy (lunar crater)
 Airy (Martian crater)
 Airy-0, a smaller crater within the previous one on Mars, and which defines the prime meridian of the planet
 Airy wave theory, a linear theory describing the propagation of "gravity waves" on the surface of a fluid
 Airy disk, a diffraction pattern in optics
 Airy beam, a non-spreading, transversely accelerating optical wavepacket
 Airy function, a mathematical function
 Airy points, support points chosen to minimize the distortion of the  length of a physical standard (such as the International Prototype Meter)
 Anna Airy (1882–1964), British artist
 Airy (software), a video-downloading utility
 Airy, a character in the video game Bravely Default

See also 
 Airey (disambiguation)  
 Mount Airy (disambiguation)
 Aerie (disambiguation)